The Supreme Soviet of the Russian SFSR (Verkhovny Sovet RSFSR), later Supreme Soviet of the Russian Federation (Verkhovny Sovet Rossiyskoy Federatsii) was the supreme government institution of the Russian SFSR in 1938–1990; in 1990–1993 it was a permanent legislature (parliament), elected by the Congress of People's Deputies of the Russian Federation.

The Supreme Soviet of the Russian SFSR was established to be similar in structure to the Supreme Soviet of the USSR in 1938, instead of the All-Russian Congress of Soviets as the highest organ of power of Russia.

In the 1940s, the Supreme Soviet Presidium and the Council of Ministers of the Russian SFSR were located in the former mansion of counts Osterman (3 Delegatskaya Street), which was later in 1991 given to a museum. The sessions were held in Grand Kremlin Palace. In 1981 the Supreme Soviet was moved to a specially constructed building on Krasnopresnenskaya embankment, The House of Soviets.

The Supreme Soviet was abolished in October 1993 (after the events of Russia's 1993 constitutional crisis) and replaced by the Federal Assembly of Russia (consists of the Federation Council of Russia and State Duma).

1938–1990

Chairman of the Supreme Soviet of the RSFSR for election of the Presidium of the Supreme Soviet
 Andrei Zhdanov (15–19 July 1938)

Chairman of the Presidium of the Supreme Soviet of the Russian SFSR
Prior to 1990, the Chairman of the Presidium of the Supreme Soviet was head of state of the Russian SFSR but exercised only nominal powers. In contrast to other Soviet republics of the Soviet Union, the Russian SFSR did not have its own Communist Party and did not have its own first secretaries (which in other republics are relatively independent of power) until 1990.

Chairman of the Presidium of the Supreme Soviet of the Russian SFSR

Chairman of the Supreme Soviet of the Russian SFSR in 1938–1990

1990–1993
Following the adoption of amendments to the Constitution of the Russian SFSR in October 1989, the office of Chairman of the Presidium of the Supreme Soviet was removed, and the position of the Russian head of state passed directly to the Chairman of the Supreme Soviet of the RSFSR in May 1990.

From 1990 to 1993 the Supreme Soviet consisted of 252 deputies in the two equal chambers—the Soviet of the Republic (Chairman: Veniamin Sokolov) and the Soviet of Nationalities (Chairman: Ramazan Abdulatipov). However, the bicameral Supreme Soviet was nominal, because the major decisions were adopted as joint resolutions and concurrent resolutions of all chambers; many of the legislative committees were shared between these chambers. The Supreme Soviet of Russia ceased to exist after the events of September–October 1993.

Chairmen of the Supreme Soviet of the Russian SFSR/Federation in 1990-1993

First Deputy Chairmen of the Supreme Soviet of the Russian SFSR/Federation 1990-1993

See also

 Declaration of State Sovereignty of the Russian Soviet Federative Socialist Republic

Notes

References

External links
 Highest governmental authorities of the Russian SFSR
 Electoral law of 1946
 Electoral law of 1978
 Regulations of the Supreme Soviet of the Russian SFSR (1990)
 Proposed electoral law of 1992 (alongside the main bill «On the basis of electoral procedure»)
 Chapter 15 of the 1993 "parliamentary" project of the Russian Constitution; related to Supreme Soviet, referendums and international treaties 

 
1938 establishments in Russia
1993 disestablishments in Russia
Defunct bicameral legislatures
Russian Soviet Federative Socialist Republic
Russia